The Edenton Tea Party was a political protest in Edenton, North Carolina, in response to the Tea Act, passed by the British Parliament in 1773.  Inspired by the Boston Tea Party and the calls for tea boycotts and the resolutions of the first North Carolina Provincial Congress, 51 women, led by Penelope Barker, met on October 25, 1774, and signed a statement of protest vowing to give up tea and boycott other British products "until such time that all acts which tend to enslave our Native country shall be repealed."

Organized by women
The Edenton Tea Party was a landmark, not because of the stances taken—boycotts were common across the Thirteen Colonies—but because it was organized by women.  Women in the colonies were generally invisible in politics, but the Edenton Tea Party was one of the first instances of political action organized and enacted by women.  Despite their usual absence at political gatherings, women played a significant role in the running of the household and were therefore crucial to boycott efforts organized and popularized by men.  Barker believed their action would be noteworthy in England and sent a copy of the declaration to the British press.  She said at the time, “Maybe it has only been men who have protested the king up to now.  That only means we women have taken too long to let our voices be heard.  We are signing our names to a document, not hiding ourselves behind costumes like the men in Boston did at their tea party.  The British will know who we are.”

The reaction in England was mostly derogatory and dismissive, as seen in engraver Philip Dawe's satirical depiction of the event.  However, in the colonies it inspired many others to take up the boycotts and their actions were praised by many patriots. The Edenton tea party had 50 women, or 51 including Penelope Barker. The signers of the declaration include Abagail Charlton, Mary Blount, F. Johnstone, Elizabeth Creacy, Margaret Cathcart, Elizabeth Patterson, Anne Johnstone, Jane Wellwood, Margaret Pearson, Mary Woolard, Penelope Dawson, Sarah Beasley, Jean Blair, Susannah Vail, Grace Clayton, Elizabeth Vail, Frances Hall, Mary Jones, Mary Creacy, Anne Hall, Rebecca Bondfield, Ruth Benbury, Sarah Littlejohn, Sarah Howcott, Penelope Barker, Sarah Hoskins, Elizabeth P. Ormond, Mary Littledle, M. Payne, Sarah Valentine, Elizabeth Johnston, Elizabeth Crickett, Mary Bonner, Elizabeth Green, Lydia Bonner, Mary Ramsay, Sarah Howe, Anne Horniblow, Lydia Bennet, Mary Hunter, Marion Wells, Tresia Cunningham, Anne Anderson, Elizabeth Roberts, Sarah Mathews, Anne Haughton, and Elizabeth Beasly.

Text
The full text of the petition reads:

See also
 Boston Tea Party
 Philadelphia Tea Party
 Continental Association adopted on October 20, 1774

References

External links
Edenton Tea Party at the North Carolina History Project
Edenton haven Tea Party at North Carolina Digital History

1774 in the Thirteen Colonies
Consumer boycotts
History of North Carolina
North Carolina in the American Revolution
Tax resistance in the United States
 
1774 in North Carolina